Podolsk is a city in Moscow Oblast, Russia.

Podolsk may also refer to:
Podolsk (inhabited locality), name of several other inhabited localities in Russia
Podolsk Governorate, a governorate of Imperial Russia, now in Ukraine
Kamianets-Podilskyi (also known as Kamenets-Podolsk), a city in Ukraine